Frederic Bertley is a Canadian immunologist and science educator. He is currently the President & CEO of COSI (Center of Science and Industry), a science museum   in Columbus, Ohio. Prior to COSI, Bertley worked as Senior Vice President for Science and Education at The Franklin Institute in Philadelphia.

Career 
Bertley earned a bachelor's degree from with a focus in physiology, mathematics, and the history of science in 1994 and a Ph.D. in immunology in 1999, both from McGill University. In 2003, he went on to receive his post-doctoral fellowship at Harvard Medical School.

After his postdoctoral fellowship, Bertley worked as a scientist at Millennium Pharmaceuticals before joining WilmerHale LLP as a technology specialist in 2004, In  2008 he became the vice president of the Center for Innovation in Science Learning at the Franklin Institute. In late 2016, Bertley left the Franklin institute to become the president and CEO of COSI.

Recognition 

 Honorary Doctorate Degree in Public Service from Otterbein University, 2018
George Washington Carver Award, Temple University/The Academy of Natural Sciences, 2017
 Minority Business Leader of the Year Award Philadelphia Business Journal, 2014
 Mid-Atlantic Regional Emmy For The Franklin Institute Awards Program: Declaration of Progress: Mid-Atlantic Chapter of the National Academy of Television and Science, 2013
Dell Inspire 100 World Changers, 2012
40 Under 40 Philadelphia Business Journal, 2010

References

External links 
 TheHistorymakers.com Biography 
 The Franklin Institute official website

Scientists from Montreal
Franklin Institute
Living people
McGill University Faculty of Science alumni
Harvard Medical School alumni
American immunologists
HIV/AIDS activists
African-American scientists
Science communicators
Year of birth missing (living people)
American chief executives
Wilmer Cutler Pickering Hale and Dorr people